The Yakima Fold Belt of south-central Washington, also called the Yakima fold-and-thrust belt, is an area of topographical folds (or wrinkles) raised by tectonic compression. It is a  structural-tectonic sub province of the western Columbia Plateau Province resulting from complex and poorly understood regional tectonics. The folds are associated with geological faults whose seismic risk is of particular concern to the nuclear facilities at the Hanford Nuclear Reservation (immediately northwest of the Tri-Cities) and major dams on the Columbia and Snake Rivers.

Location and extent

The topographical distinctness of the Yakima Folds (see the shaded-relief image) is due to their formation in a layer of lava flows and sedimentary deposits that have filled-in and generally smoothed the topographic surface of a large area of the Columbia Basin.  The extent of these lava flows was limited to the west and north by the rising Cascade Mountains and the Wenatchee Mountains.  The lava flows extend east well beyond this image, but the Yakima Folds do not. The northernmost fold seen here (Frenchman Hills) ends at the Potholes Reservoir, another (Saddle Mountains) terminates just south of there, near the town of Othello (red circle). South of the Tri-Cities the rampart of the Horse Heaven Hills extends for a short distance past the Columbia River. The ends of these ridges mark the edge of a block of continental crust (part of the North American craton, indicated by the dashed orange line) that has resisted the tectonic compression that formed the ridges.

The southernmost ridge of the Yakima Fold Belt is the Columbia Hills on the north side of the Columbia River. The pattern of folding continues with the Dalles-Umatilla Syncline just south of the Columbia River, and further into Oregon with the Blue Mountains anticline, which approximately parallels the Klamath-Blue Mountain Lineament that marks the southeastern edge of Siletzia (see geological map, below).

The Yakima Fold Belt is also located on, and the orientation and spacing of some of the Folds influenced by, the Olympic–Wallowa Lineament (OWL), a broad zone of linear topographical features (dashed yellow line) extending from the Olympic Peninsula in northwestern Washington to the Wallowa Mountains in northeastern Oregon.

Geology

It is the central portion of the Olympic–Wallowa Lineament, referred to as the Cle Elum-Wallula deformed zone (CLEW), constising of a series of generally east-trending narrow asymmetrical anticlinal ridges and broad synclinal valleys formed by folding of Miocene Columbia River basalt flows and sediments. In most parts of the belt the folds have a north vergence (Columbia Hills' south vergence is an exception) with the steep limb typically faulted by imbricate thrust faults. Fold lengths range from 1 km to 100 km with wavelengths from several kilometers to 20 km.

A graben underlies nearly the entire Yakima Fold Belt and has been subsiding since Eocene time, and continues to sink at a slow rate.

A 2011 report found aeromagnetic, gravity, and paleoseismic evidence that the Yakima Fold Belt is linked to active Puget Sound faults.

Geodesy
Geodetic studies of the Oregon Rotation show that Oregon is rotating about a point somewhat south of Lewiston, Idaho compressing the Yakima fold an average of 3 millimeters per year, and the Washington Pacific coast about 7 millimeters per year.

Studies of the motion of the Yakima Fold Belt have been undertaken to evaluate seismic hazards at the Hanford Site.

See also
 Columbia Plateau (ecoregion)#Yakima Folds bioregion

Notes and sources

Notes

Sources

Further reading

 — includes flythrough animations

Geology of Washington (state)
Hills of Washington (state)